"House of Fire" is a 1989 single by American rock musician Alice Cooper from his 1989 album Trash. It was co-written by rock guitarist and vocalist Joan Jett alongside songwriter Desmond Child, the latter of which who had previously composed for performers such as Billy Squier, Bonnie Tyler, and Ronnie Spector.

The single initially came out in late 1989 within the United Kingdom, where it peaked at #65. "House of Fire" was released in the U.S. in early 1990 and reached #56 on the Billboard Hot 100 as well as #39 on the Mainstream Rock Tracks chart.

A demo version of "House of Fire" was recorded by Bon Jovi. It surfaced in 2014 as part of the band's alternate Deluxe Edition version of New Jersey.

Chart positions

References

1989 singles
Songs written by Alice Cooper
Songs written by Desmond Child
Songs written by Joan Jett
Alice Cooper songs
Song recordings produced by Desmond Child
1989 songs
Epic Records singles
Glam metal songs